Or Zahavi is an Israeli footballer who plays Bnei Yehuda.

Career
Zahavi started his career his career in Beitar Jerusalem's youth team. In Summer 2016 signed in Hapoel Jerusalem. On 18 November 2016, he made his debut in the 0–3 loss to Hapoel Acre.

In summer 2018 returned to Beitar Jerusalem. On 12 July 2018, made his European debut in the 0–0 draw against Chikhura Sachkhere. On 14 March 2019, signed for more 4 years in Beitar...

Career statistics

References

External links
 

1996 births
Living people
Israeli footballers
Hapoel Jerusalem F.C. players
Beitar Jerusalem F.C. players
Bnei Yehuda Tel Aviv F.C. players
Liga Leumit players
Israeli Premier League players
Footballers from Jerusalem
Association football defenders